Mather (CST) is an unincorporated community recognized as a local urban district in southwest Manitoba, Canada, and part of Cartwright – Roblin Municipality. The Mather area is known as Crocus Country.

Businesses
The area around Mather is primarily a farming community. Mather also has a Harms Seeds, Yake's Service, as well as a barbershop.

Mixed farming is most common in the Mather area. Commonly harvested yields consist of wheat, barley, oats, canola, corn, soybeans and flax, as well as some sunflower and pea crops.

Attractions
The Rock and Memorial Wall
"The Rock’" was moved by road on a metal skid to the centre of Mather as a commemorative marker. It was balanced on the skid with railway ties and due to the friction of the road and skid, enough heat was created to start the railway ties on fire. It is located next to the "Memorial Wall" which commemorates the 100th anniversary of the settlement of Mather. The brick wall displays over 550 family names of past and present residents.

The Grove
"The Grove" is a privately owned garden with winding paths, a small chapel, a fountain, a playhouse, and a summer house. The Grove has become a local hot spot for summer weddings.

Rock Lake
Mather is just south of Rock Lake where many water related activities take place in summer.

Boundary Commission Trail
Mather is located along the Boundary Commission Trail.

Notable people
Terry Yake - Hockey player

See also 
List of regions of Manitoba
List of rural municipalities in Manitoba

References

External links

The community of Mather, Manitoba

Local urban districts in Manitoba